Hugh Bernard Slavin (5 May 1882 – 1947) was an English footballer who played in the Football League for The Wednesday.

References

1882 births
1947 deaths
English footballers
Association football defenders
English Football League players
Sheffield Wednesday F.C. players